"Excalibur" is a song by Italian group F.C.B. (Favilli Cristofori Bresil), released in 1995, the song peaked at number 2 on the ARIA charts and was certified gold.

Track listings
 "Excalibur" (Radio Mix) - 3:57	
 "Excalibur" (Skitz Mix) - 6:24	
 "Excalibur" (Templar) - 5:30	
 "Merlinmelodic Song" - 5:17

Charts

Weekly charts

Year-end charts

Certifications

References

1995 singles
1995 songs